Dragon Ball GT is the third anime series in the Dragon Ball franchise and a  sequel to the Dragon Ball Z anime series. Produced by Toei Animation, the series premiered in Japan on Fuji TV on February 7, 1996, spanning 64 episodes until its conclusion on November 19, 1997. Unlike the other anime series in the Dragon Ball franchise, Dragon Ball GT is not based on the manga series written by Akira Toriyama, but a project by Toei Animation; the same characters are used, and the series also continues the story where Dragon Ball Z had left off.

Funimation licensed the series for an English language Region 1 DVD release and broadcast in the United States. Funimation's English dub of the series aired on Cartoon Network from November 7, 2003, to April 16, 2005. The original television broadcast skipped the first 16 episodes of the series. Instead, Funimation created a composition episode entitled "A Grand Problem," which used scenes from the skipped episodes to summarize the story. The skipped episodes were later shown on Cartoon Network as "The Lost Episodes" after the original broadcast concluded. The series was later released to DVD in the Season set form. The first set was released on December 9, 2008, and the second set was released on February 10, 2009. A "Complete Series" DVD box set was later released on September 21, 2010. AB Groupe (in association with Blue Water Studios) developed an alternate dub for Europe and Canada and was aired on YTV and Toonami UK, which divided the episodes into two seasons instead of sagas. Funimation's English dub began re-airing in the U.S. on Nicktoons from January 16, 2012, to January 2, 2015.

Dragon Ball GT uses five pieces of theme music. Field of View performs the series opening theme, which is used for all 64 episodes. , performed by Deen, is used for the ending theme for the first 26 episodes. Starting at episode 27, the series begins using Zard's "Don't You See!" for the ending theme. Episode 42 marks the next ending theme change, with "Blue Velvet" by Shizuka Kudō being used. , performed by Wands, is introduced as an ending theme in episode 51. It was used as the ending theme for the remainder of the series.

Seasons overview
In Japan, Dragon Ball GT (like both of the previous Dragon Ball series) was aired year-round continuously, with regular off-days for sporting events and television specials.

Episode list

Season 1: Black Star Dragon Ball Saga  (1996)

Season 2: Baby Saga (1996–97)

Season 3: Super Android 17 Saga (1997)

Season 4: Shadow Dragon Saga (1997)

Specials

Notes

References

GT

ca:Llista d'episodis de Bola de Drac